House of Folklore is a museum in central Sana'a, Yemen. It is located southwest of the Al-Tahrir Square and south of the Egyptian Embassy and north of the Chinese Embassy. Founded on 11 April 2004 under the permission of the Ministry of Culture, it is "a cultural, research, non-profit and non-governmental organization works on collecting and documenting the Yemeni Folklore". The house was closed in May 2010 due to financial difficulties.

References

External links
Official site

Buildings and structures in Sanaa
Museums in Yemen
2004 establishments in Yemen
Museums established in 2004